Awara Abdullah is a 1963 Bollywood film starring Dara Singh and Helen.

Cast
 Dara Singh
 Chandrashekhar
 Helen

Music

External links

1960s Hindi-language films
1963 films
Films scored by Datta Naik